Kefeli is a small village in Tarsus district of Mersin Province, Turkey. The population of village is only 93  as of 2011. Main economic activity is farming. Cotton and various vegetables and produced..

References

Villages in Tarsus District